List of United States Hockey League players drafted by the National Hockey League.

Draftees

Sources
 USHL 2006-07 Media Guide

United States Hockey League players
USHL